Siona Fernandes is a dancer, educator and Olympian. She has a masters degree in Psychology (India), and masters in Sport (New Zealand) with a Bachelor's in Performing arts (India), trained in the Kalakshetra style of Bharatanatyam.

Biography
Fernandes was born in Goa, India and migrated to New Zealand at 24 years of age. Fernandes trained in Indian classical dancing Bharathanatyam for 17 years. After migrating to New Zealand she trained as a medic and infantry corp in the Army. Fernandes remains the first woman in the flyweight division to represent New Zealand in Boxing at any Olympic Games.
  
Fernandes is a recipient of several awards. In India, Fernandes is the first female probable in her state chosen to represent at the Asian Basketball Games by the National Basket Ball Federation of India. the Junior chamber of India awarded her as ‘child prodigy’. Fernandes holds several titles and awards in sport including the title of the "Most scientific female boxer" in elite-level female boxing in New Zealand. Fernandes is well established speaker and educator,  in the field of sport, health and fitness.

Achievements
 2018 - Academic Scholar, Australia.
 2016 - Sports Ambassador, New Zealand.
 2012 - Boxing, representative New Zealand, Olympic Games, London.
 2011 - Title "Most scientific female boxer", elite-level female boxing, New Zealand
 2011 - National Amateur Boxing Champion, New Zealand
 2011 - Silver Medal, Boxing, Arafura Games, Darwin, Australia.
 2010 - Silver Medal, Boxing, Oceania Games, Australia.

References

External links
 

1982 births
Living people
People from North Goa district
Goan people
New Zealand women boxers
Olympic boxers
Boxers at the 2012 Summer Olympics
Indian emigrants to New Zealand
New Zealand people of Indian descent
Sportswomen from Goa
Bangalore University alumni
Flyweight boxers